Perivi John Katjavivi, is a Namibian-British filmmaker. He has made several critically acclaimed films including Eembwiti, The Unseen and Film Festival Film. Apart from direction, he is also a producer, writer, camera operator, actor, cinematographer and editor.

Personal life
Katjavivi was born in Oxford, England and has with five siblings. His father Peter Katjavivi is a Namibian politician and diplomat,  the speaker of the National Assembly of Namibia, his mother is Briton Jane Katjavivi.

Katjavivi grew up in Windhoek, the capital of Namibia. He studied film at Columbia College in Los Angeles where he obtained a BA. He holds an MA in African Cinema from the University of Cape Town. He is currently a PhD candidate in Visual History at the University of the Western Cape.

Career
In 2016, Katjavivi made his maiden feature film The Unseen. The film was screened at several film festivals including Busan, in competition at Durban. The film won the award for the Best Film at Innsbruck in Austria as well. In 2019, he produced the short Film Festival Film, was co-directed with Mpumelelo Mcata. The film has its World Premiere at the 69th Berlinale in February 2019.

Apart from cinema, he has also written extensively for the Windhoek Observer, Africa is a Country and OkayAfrica.

Filmography

References

External links
 
 The legacy of the first genocide of the 20th century
 The German Namibian Genocide–What is to be done?
 An interview with the director of ‘Paths To Freedom’, a film on Namibian liberation
 White Masks

Living people
Namibian film directors
People from Oxford
Namibian film producers
1984 births